DYJB-TV, channel 12, is a television station of Philippine television network Intercontinental Broadcasting Corporation in Iloilo City. Its offices are located at Datu Puti Subdivision, Brgy. Cubay, Jaro, Iloilo City and its transmitter is located at Purok 7, Brgy. Alaguisoc, Jordan, Guimaras. This station is currently operates on a low powered signal.

DYJB-TV 12 history 
 1975 - First broadcast and became the first TV station in Panay Island.
 April 27, 2022 - IBC Iloilo commenced digital test broadcasts on UHF Channel 17 covering Metro Iloilo and the provinces of Iloilo and Guimaras.

IBC 12 Iloilo previously aired programs 
 12 Under Club - first TV kid show in the whole Region VI.
 Ikaw Kabuhi Ko (1975-1997; 1999-2003) - first and longest humanitarian public service show in the Western Visayas region.
 Kampeon sa Rehiyon -  first talent show in Region VI.
 Tele-Radyo - first local noon time talk show now dubbed as "PaniudTALK".

Digital television

Digital channels

DYJB-TV's digital signal operates on UHF channel 17 (491.143 MHz) and broadcasts on the following subchannels:

Areas of coverage

Primary areas  
 Iloilo City
 Iloilo Province
 Guimaras

Secondary areas 
Bacolod  
Portion of Negros Occidental

Trivia 
 IBC TV-12 Iloilo reaches even outside Iloilo as a translator signal via DYXX TV-2 in Roxas City, Capiz. But due to weather disturbance, IBC 2 Roxas went off the air as of this time since it was last on air in 1993, when the typhoon struck the city causing the transmitter to be heavily damaged.
 Only two IBC-owned radio stations- DYJJ-AM 1296 khz in Roxas City and DYRG-AM 1251khz in Kalibo, Aklan are still active on air across Panay Island.

See also 
 List of television and radio stations in Iloilo City
 List of Intercontinental Broadcasting Corporation channels and stations

Television stations in Iloilo City
Intercontinental Broadcasting Corporation stations
Television channels and stations established in 1966
Television channels and stations established in 1975
Digital television stations in the Philippines